The National Football League (NFL) is an annual Gaelic football competition between the senior county teams of Ireland plus London. Sponsored by Allianz, it is officially known as the Allianz National Football League.

The Gaelic Athletic Association organises the league. The winning team receives the New Ireland Cup, presented by the New Ireland Assurance Company. The National Football League is the second most prestigious inter-county Gaelic Football competition after the All-Ireland Senior Football Championship.

Unlike many league competitions in sport, each team plays the other teams in their division only once.  Teams that meet in the same division over the course of a number of years often play on a home and away basis in alternative years, though this is not strictly adhered to.  Once the divisional matches have been played, the latter stages of the league become a knockout competition for the top teams in each division.  This is seen as good preparation for the upcoming All-Ireland Championship and there is usually more intensity to the division finals than those played earlier in the league, but still lacking the intensity of Championship matches.

Kerry are the current league champions, having won the 2022 league.

History
The National Football League was first held in 1925–26, thirty-eight years after the first All-Ireland Senior Football Championship. Laois won the inaugural National Football League. The NFL has traditionally played second fiddle to the All-Ireland Senior Football Championship, with most counties using it as preparation for that event. This was not helped by the fact that the league was initially played in winter (usually November–March), while the Championship had the more attractive summer dates and knockout structure.

Mayo dominated the early NFL, winning seven titles in eight seasons until the tournament was suspended during the Second World War. For many seasons in the 1950s and 1960s, the winners of the "home" league played New York in the NFL final; the journey to New York formed an additional prize for the winners. New York won three of these finals.

In 2002, the league was changed to a February–April calendar. This increased interest, boosted attendances and led to live games being broadcast on TG4. The 2009 season was broadcast live on Setanta Sports. Coverage of the 2010 finals in Croke Park saw TG4 become the most watched channel, with 650,000 viewers tuning in to watch some of the games. The Division 1 Final had an average audience of 220,000 viewers.

The National Football League winners receive the Irish National Insurance Cup, first presented to Kerry in 1928–29. Kerry is the most successful team in the competition, having played in the final on twenty-nine occasions and won twenty-three of these. Both of these (final appearances and wins) are records. Kerry also is the team to have most often achieved the "double", by winning both the league title and the All-Ireland Senior Football Championship.

Schedule
In the 20th century, National League fixtures were played during inter-county windows in the later and early months of the calendar year, while the SFC occupied the inter-county window during those months that made up the middle of the year, e.g. May, August. Club competitions of lesser importance occurred alongside the inter-county games so as to provide meaningful game time for players possessed of insufficient ability to compete at the higher (inter-county) level.

From 2002, National League fixtures were played during the early months of the calendar year, preceding the SFC, which remained in the traditional mid-year position. An April club window allowed inter-county players to return to their clubs to participate in some early rounds of the more important club competitions, i.e. championship fixtures.

This arrangement was disrupted during the COVID-19 pandemic. Due to the impact of the pandemic on Gaelic games, the 2020 National League was suspended in March and all Gaelic games ceased until the middle of the year, when club fixtures were first to resume. The National League was then completed in October, ahead of the All-Ireland Senior Football Championship (which was completed in December). This led to a motion (passed at the 2021 GAA Congress) to adopt a "split season" model, whereby club competitions would occupy one part of the calendar year and inter-county fixtures the other part.

Finals listed by year

Winners

Wins by provinces

Division 2

2023 Teams
  Clare
  Cork
  Derry
  Dublin
  Kildare
  Limerick
  Louth
  Meath

List of Finals

Roll of Honour

Division 3

2023 Teams
  Antrim
  Cavan
  Down
  Fermanagh 
  Longford
  Offaly
  Tipperary
  Westmeath

List of Finals

Roll of Honour

Division 4

2023 Teams
  Carlow
  Laois
  Leitrim
  London 
  Sligo
  Waterford
  Wexford
  Wicklow

List of Finals

Roll of Honour

Records and statistics

See also
Ladies' National Football League
 National Hurling League

References

External links
 National League Results, Fixtures and Statistics
 Semi-final and final results 1926– 
 National Football League attendances, Seán Moran in The Irish Times, 29 April 2014
 "Five FL finals worth looking at again", Hogan Stand, 7 April 2021

 
All-Ireland organisations
 
!
Gaelic football
Professional sports leagues in Ireland